So people may refer to:
the Asho tribe of Burma and Bangladesh
the people of the Sao civilisation of Africa
So people of Laos

See also
So language (disambiguation)